Coconut drop, also known as drops, is a Jamaican cuisine dessert made with cut up coconut meat, ginger and brown sugar.

See also
 List of Jamaican dishes

References

External links
Coconut drops Grace Food creative kitchen
How to make coconut drops YouTube

Foods containing coconut
Jamaican desserts
Ginger dishes